The 2004 NFL season was the 85th regular season of the National Football League (NFL).

With the New England Patriots as the defending league champions, regular season play was held from September 9, 2004 to January 2, 2005. Hurricanes forced the rescheduling of two Miami Dolphins home games: the game against the Tennessee Titans was moved up one day to Saturday, September 11 to avoid oncoming Hurricane Ivan, while the game versus the Pittsburgh Steelers on Sunday, September 26 was moved back 7½ hours to miss the eye of Hurricane Jeanne.

The playoffs began on January 8, and eventually the New England Patriots repeated as NFL champions when they defeated the Philadelphia Eagles in Super Bowl XXXIX at ALLTEL Stadium in Jacksonville, Florida on February 6.

Transactions
February 24, 2004, The Washington Redskins released Bruce Smith, the NFL's all-time sack leader, saving $6.5 million in salary cap space.

Draft
The 2004 NFL Draft was held from April 24 to 25, 2004 at New York City's Theater at Madison Square Garden. With the first pick, the San Diego Chargers selected quarterback Eli Manning from the University of Mississippi.

Referee changes
Ron Blum returned to line judge (where he officiated Super Bowl XXIV and Super Bowl XXVI), and Bill Vinovich was promoted to take his place as referee.

Midway through the season, Johnny Grier, the NFL's first African-American referee, suffered a leg injury that forced him to retire. He was permanently replaced by the back judge on his crew, Scott Green, who had previous experience as a referee in NFL Europe.

Rule changes
Due to several incidents during the previous year, officials are authorized to penalize excessive celebration. The 15-yard unsportsmanlike conduct penalty will be marked off from the spot at the end of the previous play or, after a score, on the ensuing kickoff. If the infraction is ruled flagrant by the officials, the player(s) are ejected.
Timeouts can be called by head coaches.
The league's jersey numbering system was modified to allow wide receivers wear numbers 10–19, in addition to 80–89.
A punt or missed field goal that is untouched by the receiving team is immediately dead once it touches either the end zone or any member of the kicking team in the end zone. Previously, a punt or missed field goal that lands in the end zone before being controlled by the kicking team could be picked up by a member of the receiving team and immediately run the other way.
Teams will be awarded a third instant replay challenge if their first two are successful. Previously, teams were only limited to two regardless of what occurred during the game.
The one-bar facemask was outlawed. The few remaining players who still used the one-bar facemask at the time were allowed to continue to use the style for the remainder of their career under a grandfather clause. (Scott Player was the last player to wear the one-bar facemask in ).

2004 deaths
 Pat Tillman former safety for the Arizona Cardinals was killed during a friendly fire incident during the war in Afghanistan

 Reggie White former defensive end for the Green Bay Packers, Philadelphia Eagles, and Carolina Panthers unexpectedly died on December 26, 2004 just seven days after his 43rd birthday from complications of sleep apnea

Final regular season standings

Tiebreakers
Indianapolis clinched the AFC #3 seed instead of San Diego based on better head-to-head record (1–0).
N.Y. Jets clinched the AFC #5 seed instead of Denver based on better record in common games (5–0 to 3–2).
St. Louis clinched the NFC #5 seed instead of Minnesota or New Orleans based on better conference record (7–5 to Minnesota's 5–7 to New Orleans' 6–6).
 Minnesota clinched the NFC #6 seed instead of New Orleans based on better head-to-head record (1–0).
N.Y. Giants finished ahead of Dallas and Washington in the NFC East based on better head-to-head record (3–1 to Dallas' 2–2 to Washington's 1–3).
Dallas finished ahead of Washington in the NFC East based on better head-to-head record (2–0).

Playoffs

The Miami Dolphins were the first team to be eliminated from the playoff race, having reached a 1–9 record by week 11.

Bracket

Milestones
The following teams and players set all-time NFL records during the season:

The Colts led the NFL with 522 points scored. The Colts tallied more points in the first half of each of their games of the 2004 NFL season (277 points) than seven other NFL teams managed in the entire season. Despite throwing for 49 touchdown passes, Peyton Manning attempted fewer than 500 passes for the first time in his NFL career.  The San Francisco 49ers' record 420 consecutive scoring games that had started in Week 5 of the 1977 season ended in Week 2 of the season.

Statistical leaders

Team

Individual

Awards

Coaching changes
Arizona Cardinals – Dennis Green replaced Dave McGinnis who was fired after the 2003 season
Atlanta Falcons – Jim L. Mora replaced Wade Phillips who replaced Dan Reeves who was fired during the 2003 season
Buffalo Bills – Mike Mularkey replaced Gregg Williams who was fired after the 2003 season
Chicago Bears – Lovie Smith replaced Dick Jauron who was fired after the 2003 season
Oakland Raiders – Norv Turner replaced Bill Callahan who was fired after the 2003 season
New York Giants – Tom Coughlin replaced Jim Fassel who was fired after the 2003 season
Washington Redskins – Joe Gibbs replaced Steve Spurrier who resigned after the 2003 season

Stadium changes
 Carolina Panthers: Ericsson Stadium was renamed Bank of America Stadium after Bank of America acquired the naming rights.
 Minnesota Vikings: The AstroTurf at the Metrodome was replaced with a new FieldTurf field.
 Oakland Raiders: Network Associates Coliseum was renamed McAfee Coliseum to reflect naming right holder, Network Associates, changing its name to McAfee.
 San Francisco 49ers: Monster Cable acquired the naming rights to Candlestick Park, renaming it merely to "Monster Park" without any qualifier. This eventually results in confusion among fans who erroneously think the name instead refers to Monster.com or Monster Energy.
 Seattle Seahawks: Seahawks Stadium was renamed Qwest Field after telecommunications carrier Qwest acquired the naming rights.

New uniforms
 The Atlanta Falcons switched the primary and alternate jerseys, making the red ones the primary and the black ones the alternate.
 The Baltimore Ravens added black third alternative uniforms.
 The Cincinnati Bengals introduced new uniforms, featuring black jerseys with orange tiger-striped sleeves, white jerseys with black tiger-striped sleeves, and orange third alternate uniforms. A new logo featuring an orange "B" with black tiger stripes was also unveiled.
 The Chicago Bears added orange third alternate uniforms.
 The Indianapolis Colts switched from blue face masks and white shoes to gray face masks and black shoes
 The Jacksonville Jaguars made modification to their white uniforms, changing the teal number with black and gold trim to black numbers with gold and teal trim. Also introduced were new black pants with the Jaguars logo on hip.
 The New York Giants added red third alternate uniforms.
 The San Diego Chargers returned to navy pants with their white jerseys.

Television
This was the seventh year under the league's eight-year broadcast contracts with ABC, CBS, Fox, and ESPN to televise Monday Night Football, the AFC package, the NFC package, and Sunday Night Football, respectively.

At CBS, Jim Nantz and Greg Gumbel swapped roles. Nantz replaced Gumbel as the network's lead play-by-play announcer while Gumbel took Nantz's hosting duties on The NFL Today. Shannon Sharpe also joined The NFL Today as an analyst, replacing Deion Sanders.

ESPN play-by-play announcer Mike Patrick missed the first few broadcasts to recover from heart bypass surgery. Pat Summerall filled in those weeks for Patrick.

Starting this season CBS, Fox, ABC, and ESPN started broadcasting regular season games in High Definition. CBS would do select games weekly, while Fox, ABC, and ESPN broadcast every game weekly.

Notes

External links
Football Outsiders 2004 Team Efficiency Ratings

References
 NFL Record and Fact Book
 NFL History 2001– (Last accessed October 17, 2005)
 Total Football: The Official Encyclopedia of the National Football League
 Celebration penalty among rules changes (Last accessed October 17, 2005)

2004
 
National Football League